St Colm's High School is a secondary school located in Draperstown, Mid-Ulster, Northern Ireland. The school opened in September 1961. It is within the Education Authority (North Eastern) region.

Academics
St. Colm's High School Draperstown is the top non selective school in Northern Ireland. in 2018, 87.7% of its entrants achieved five or more GCSEs at grades A* to C, including the core subjects English and Maths. Also in 2018, 88% of its entrants to the A-level exam achieved A*-C grades.

Awards
In 2018, it received The Irish News School Wellbeing Award.

In 2019, it was awarded the most sustainable school in the UK prize at the TES (magazine) awards.

In 2020, the school won the TES (magazine)  Community and Collaboration Award.

Notable staff
 Pat Loughrey (born 1960) - academic, Warden of Goldsmiths, University of London

Notable students
 Tony Scullion (born 1962) - Gaelic footballer and hurler
 Emma Sheerin (born 1991) - politician

References

External links
St Colm's High School

Educational institutions established in 1961
Catholic secondary schools in Northern Ireland
Secondary schools in County Londonderry
1961 establishments in Northern Ireland